Survivor: Palau is the tenth season of the American CBS competitive reality television series Survivor. The season filmed from November 1, 2004, through December 9, 2004, and premiered on February 17, 2005. Filming took place in Koror, Palau. Hosted by Jeff Probst, it consisted of the usual 39 days of gameplay with 20 competitors, the most the series had ever begun with up to that point.

For the second time since the series' premiere, the contestants selected the tribes instead of the producers. The self-selection into two tribes of nine left two contestants not chosen and immediately eliminated from the game. In the game, Koror dominated from the very beginning, winning every immunity challenge and all but three reward challenges. Mid-game, having survived alone at Ulong after the entirety of her tribe had been voted out or eliminated at tribal councils, its last remaining player, Stephenie LaGrossa received a map to Koror. While the players at the finale spoke of this as a merger, the producers have described Palau as the only season without a merge. In the end, fire lieutenant Tom Westman defeated advertising executive Katie Gallagher in a 6–1 jury vote to become the Sole Survivor.

In addition to host Probst naming this as one of his favorite seasons, he stated that the final immunity challenge was his favorite immunity challenge from any season. He also said Palau was his favorite filming location. Survivor earned a Primetime Emmy Award nomination in 2005.

Contestants

The two tribes were named Ulong (named after Ulong Island, one of Palau's tourist spots) and Koror (named after the capital city of Palau at the time). This was the first (and only) season in Survivor history not to have a merged tribe.

Notable contestants include Miss USA 2002 competitor and Miss Ohio USA 2002 Kim Mullen, Actress Jennifer Lyon, and eventual Texas House of Representatives member, Jolanda Jones.

Future appearances
Bobby Jon Drinkard and Stephenie LaGrossa competed again in Survivor: Guatemala. LaGrossa later competed in Survivor: Heroes vs. Villains alongside Tom Westman on the Heroes tribe. Outside of Survivor,  LaGrossa was a contestant on the USA Network reality competition series Snake in the Grass. LaGrossa also competed on the 2023 Peacock reality TV series The Traitors.

Season summary
The twenty players began the game by rowing a boat to shore, with the first player of each gender to reach shore to win immunity. The next day, Jeff Probst announced that they would now pick tribes via a schoolyard pick, with those who had won immunity getting first pick. In addition, the last male and female remaining would immediately leave the game. The two tribes, Koror and Ulong, then participated in the first reward/immunity challenge, with the winner, Koror, deciding to leave their present beach to another one they had not seen.

As the challenges continued, it quickly became apparent that Ulong was the weaker tribe, while strong leadership by Tom and Ian at Koror kept the tribe intact. Ulong would win no immunity challenges and few reward challenges, and Koror's only visit to tribal council was the result of a double-elimination twist. Stephenie and Bobby Jon, the last two members of Ulong, lost the final tribal immunity challenge. Since they were unable to vote, the two faced off in a fire-making challenge with Stephenie emerging victorious. After spending the night alone, she was instructed to travel to Koror, and was absorbed into their tribe.

Koror developed a core group of five – Tom, Ian, Gregg, Jenn, and Katie – and those on the outside saw them as a threat but were unable to break them. Despite making an immediate strong impression on her new tribe, Stephenie was quickly identified as a target due to her strength and for being the outsider. In a twist that would eventually lead to its use in later seasons, one individual immunity challenge required the first player to drop out to spend a night alone on an isolated island. Janu was exiled and found the experience liberating, choosing to quit the game at the next tribal council, effectively sparing Stephenie from being voted out. However, her safety would not last and Stephenie was subsequently voted out.

With six players remaining, Tom and Ian decided to spare Caryn, the last remaining outsider, instead plotting with her to eliminate Gregg for potentially strengthening a bond with Katie after going on a reward together. Despite voting Gregg out, Katie felt betrayed by Ian, and her feelings worsened when Ian took Tom with him on a reward instead of her as he had promised. Ian attempted to make amends but Katie still held harsh feelings towards him. After disposing of Caryn, the final four players opted to allow the next vote to end in a tie between Jenn and Ian, and Ian won the subsequent fire-making challenge.

The final immunity challenge required players to stand on buoys for as long as possible; Katie dropped out early, but both Tom and Ian remained for nearly 12 hours. Ian opted to quit the challenge, conceding immunity to Tom, after Tom played on his remorse for hurting Katie's feelings and breaking his promises to her. Forgoing the usual tribal council, Tom voted Ian out of the game on the spot. At the final tribal council, Tom's leadership and physical ability against Katie's less dominant gameplay led the jury to award Tom the title of Sole Survivor by a vote of 6–1.

In the case of multiple tribes or castaways who win reward or immunity, they are listed in order of finish, or alphabetically where it was a team effort; where one castaway won and invited others, the invitees are in brackets.

Episodes

Voting history

Reception
Survivor: Palau has generally received praise from fans and critics alike, particularly for the gameplay of winner Tom Westman, and such memorable moments as the "bah-bah-buoy" challenge that lasted almost 12 hours (the longest challenge in American Survivor history), as well as the first-ever "tribe of one" in Survivor history. Host Jeff Probst ranked it as his 4th-favorite in 2010, citing the memorability of the buoy challenge and also calling Westman "one of our greatest winners." Andrea Deiher of Zap2it similarly ranked Palau as #4, saying that LaGrossa "became maybe the toughest woman ever to play the game," and called the buoy challenge "the most epic immunity challenge ever." Tom Santilli of Examiner.com ranked it 7th, saying that it "was one of the strongest [seasons], and featured a very memorable overall cast," adding that the "tribe of one" incident "may be one of the saddest moments in history, and cemented Stephanie in the hearts of many fans." Entertainment Weekly'''s Dalton Ross ranked it as the ninth-best season of the series, saying that he "loved watching one tribe decimate the other...the challenges may have been Survivors best ever," and although he claimed that everyone "knew Tom would win from episode 1, it was still gripping nonetheless." In 2014, Joe Reid of The Wire ranked it 10th, stating that Westman "went pretty much wire-to-wire in barnstorming this season," and played "Perhaps a perfect game," while also noting that "Stephanie and Bobby Jon won our hearts by surviving the longest on the decimated Ulong tribe, the losingest tribe of all time." In 2015, a poll by Rob Has a Podcast ranked Palau 13th out of 30 with Rob Cesternino ranking this season 9th. This was updated in 2021 during Cesternino's podcast, Survivor All-Time Top 40 Rankings, ranking 18th out of 40. Palau was also ranked 13th on "The Purple Rock Podcast," with the summary stating: "Palau has a lot of things going for it: great challenges, a good cast, an interesting way to start the game, and several great story arcs. All of those factors work into an interesting final episode that make the season memorable and result in an excellent winner." In 2020, Inside Survivor'' ranked this season 17th out of 40 citing "its wholly unique story—a story unlike any other season that came before or after" with the decimation of the Ulong tribe.

References

External links
 Official CBS Survivor Palau Website

10
2005 American television seasons
2004 in Palau
Television shows set in Palau
Television shows filmed in Palau